Johnny Hoogerland (born 13 May 1983) is a Dutch former professional cyclist, who rode professionally between 2004 and 2016 for the Van Hermet–Eurogifts,  and  squads.

Due to the prominent bull-tattoo on his arm and his roots from the peninsula of Zuid-Beveland he is nicknamed the "Bull of Beveland". He had a reputation of being an aggressive rider who took part in long breakaways. His most notable victory was the overall classification of the Driedaagse van West-Vlaanderen in 2009, where he also won a stage.

Career
In 2009 Hoogerland won the Driedaagse van West-Vlaanderen, taking stage 1 along the way. He finished in 12th place in both the Tour of Flanders and the GC of the Vuelta. He was the highest placed Dutchman in the men's road race at the 2009 World Championships, finishing in 14th place overall.

At the 2011 Tour de France Hoogerland won the Mountain jersey in the 6th stage. After losing it in the 8th stage, Hoogerland managed to recapture it in the 9th stage. In that same stage, he was then involved in a dramatic crash after a fellow breakaway rider, 's Juan Antonio Flecha, was sideswiped by a France Télévisions car, causing Hoogerland to crash into a barbed wire fence.  Despite deep cuts to his legs, requiring 33 stitches, Hoogerland finished the stage, losing nearly 17 minutes as a result of the crash. Flecha and Hoogerland were jointly awarded the Combativity award for the day. In November 2014 Hoogerland announced that he had reached a compensation agreement with insurance company AIG over the incident.

In early February 2013, Hoogerland collided with a car while he was training in Spain, preparing for the Tour Méditerranéen. He was hospitalized and it was announced that he suffered five fractured ribs, a bruised liver and bone fractures to his spine. It was believed that he would miss the whole classics season. On 23 June 2013 he unexpectedly won the National Championship of the Netherlands.

Hoogerland joined  for the 2014 season, after his previous team –  – folded at the end of the 2013 season.

In August 2014, Hoogerland was announced as the first signing for the new Dutch Pro-Continental , which formed for the 2015 season.

Major results

2001
 1st Junior Tour of Flanders
2003
 8th Overall Olympia's Tour
2004
 1st Stage 2 Ruban Granitier Breton
 7th Ronde van Vlaanderen U23
2005
 2nd Paris–Roubaix Espoirs
 3rd Road race, National Under-23 Road Championships
 3rd Brussels–Ingooigem
 7th Grote Prijs Jef Scherens
 8th Overall Olympia's Tour
 9th Internationale Wielertrofee Jong Maar Moedig
2006
 10th Ronde van Drenthe
2007
 2nd Druivenkoers Overijse
 8th Overall Tour de Slovaquie
1st Stage 2
2008
 1st Stage 3 Clasico Ciclistico Banfoandes
 3rd Overall Olympia's Tour
 3rd Overall Ringerike GP
 3rd Druivenkoers Overijse
 4th Overall Tour de Bretagne
 4th Vlaamse Pijl
 4th Hel van het Mergelland
 5th Overall Tour de Normandie
 6th Overall Tour de Hokkaido
 6th Ronde van Drenthe
 7th Schaal Sels-Merksem
2009
 1st Overall Driedaagse van West-Vlaanderen
1st Stage 1
 4th Overall Étoile de Bessèges
 5th Grand Prix d'Ouverture La Marseillaise
 5th Giro di Lombardia
 8th Eschborn-Frankfurt City Loop
2010
 Tour de Pologne
1st  Mountains classification
1st  Sprints classification
 2nd Grand Prix d'Ouverture La Marseillaise
 3rd Overall Tour Méditerranéen
 4th Druivenkoers Overijse
 5th Overall Tour of Britain
1st  Mountains classification
 6th Halle–Ingooigem
2011
 3rd Overall Étoile de Bessèges
 4th Brabantse Pijl
 Tour de France
Held  after Stages 6–7 and 9–11
 Combativity award Stage 9
2012
 3rd Druivenkoers Overijse
 5th Overall Tirreno–Adriatico
 7th Overall Vuelta a Murcia
 8th Grand Prix de Wallonie
 8th Binche–Tournai–Binche
 9th Overall Volta ao Algarve
2013
 1st  Road race, National Road Championships
 1st Amstel Curaçao Race
2014
 8th Prueba Villafranca de Ordizia

Grand Tour general classification results timeline

References

External links

Johnny Hoogerland profile at Vacansoleil-DCM

Johnny Hoogerland profile at Cycling Base

1983 births
Living people
Dutch male cyclists
People from Reimerswaal
UCI Road World Championships cyclists for the Netherlands
Cyclists from Zeeland
20th-century Dutch people
21st-century Dutch people